This is a list of villages in Rogaland, a county of Norway. For other counties see the lists of villages in Norway.

The list excludes cities located in Rogaland.

References

External links

Rogaland